ACPE may refer to:
American College of Physician Executives 
Accreditation Council for Pharmacy Education
Asian Conference on Pharmacoepidemiology, coorganized by International Society for Pharmacoepidemiology (ISPE)
Association for Clinical Pastoral Education
Australian College of Physical Education